Hedi Kyle (born 1937) is a German-born American book artist and educator who has had a major influence on the development of book arts.

She was born in what was then part of Poland. During World War II, she fled with her mother and siblings; her father served in the army. After the war, the family was reunited and moved to the German island of Borkum. After she completed high school, she attended an art school in Wiesbaden. Kyle was subsequently employed as a commercial artist in Frankfurt. When she turned 21, she spent a year painting in Greece. She moved to the United States to live with a man she had met; they married and settled in San Francisco. The couple later separated and, during the 1970s, Kyle studied with bookbinder and conservator Laura Young in New York City. She began teaching after Richard Minsky offered her a job teaching at the Center for Book Arts in New York City. She also taught at Cooper Union. Kyle next moved to Philadelphia where she worked as a conservator for the American Philosophical Society. In 1987, she was invited to teach at the University of the Arts in Philadelphia.

In 1983, along with Timothy Barrett and Gary Frost, Kyle co-founded the Paper & Book Intensive, an annual series of bookbinding, papermaking, and conservation workshops.

Over the years, Kyle has come up with new and innovative ways of assembling books which are often based on traditional bookbinding techniques. In 1993, the Center for Book Arts held an exhibition "Hedi Kyle and her Influence: 1977-1993" which featured work by Kyle and twenty contemporary book artists influenced by her. In 2015, the 23 Sandy Gallery in Portland, Oregon held an exhibition called "Hello Hedi" featuring works inspired by Kyle.

At the urging of paper artist, engineer, and writer, Paul Jackson, she and her daughter, Ulla Warchol, published Art of the Fold about some of her most popular and creative techniques for making simple books and enclosures.

References

External links

1937 births
Living people
Book artists
Women book artists
Artists from San Francisco
American people of German descent
20th-century American women artists
21st-century American women artists